The Sichuanese garden or Ba-Shu Garden is one of the major regional styles of Chinese garden developed in the Sichuan and Chongqing regions. Most of the Sichuanese gardens are located on Chengdu Plain and were built by the government as public gardens to memorize significant local celebrities, which distinguishes them from those private gardens in East China (e.g. Suzhou) and those imperial gardens in Beijing.

East Lake in Xinfan, Chengdu is one of the only two existing Chinese gardens which were built in Tang Dynasty (618–907).

See also
 List of garden types

Culture in Sichuan
Chinese gardening styles